The World Macedonian Congress (shortened as WMC or SMK) is a self-declared "non-formal parliament of the ethnic Macedonians". It presents itself as an organization fighting and demanding for more human rights to ethnic Macedonians on an international level, but is seen as an ultranationalist organization, supporting the controversial antiquization, by independent researchers and media. It is officially registered as a non-governmental organization based in North Macedonia. The organization was registered during the fall of communism, on 15 September 1990 by Todor Petrov, who is also the president of the organization. Closely related to the World Macedonian Congress are certain Macedonian organizations in the neighboring countries of North Macedonia from whom with larger importance, the Macedonian Party in Albania, the OMO Ilinden in Bulgaria, and the Democratic Party of the Macedonians in Kosovo founded by the organization’s member Ismail Boyda. The organization has been labelled as far-right by the Macedonian political scientist Zdravko Savevski.

History

Foundation
The World Macedonian Congress was the second of the two international lobby organizations or World Macedonian Congresses established in the Republic of North Macedonia with the disintegration of former Yugoslavia. It was created as a rival to the first World Macedonian Congress (created by John Bitove, Sr., a Canadian-Macedonian businessman with the encouragement of the first president of the Republic of Macedonia, Kiro Gligorov) by the opposition (VMRO-DPMNE) politician Todor Petrov and current president of the Congress. Petrov claimed the Congress was created partly to replace the "Institute for the Macedonian Diaspora", which had been discredited through its past association with the Yugoslavian secret service. The president of the World Macedonian Congress is Todor Petrov. He has been re-elected several times as president of World Macedonian Congress, last time in 2012 and his mandate expires in 2016. His deputies are: Ismail Bojda, Borce Stefanovski, Vangel Bozinovski, Frosina Tashevski-Remenski

The organization claims ideological descent from one offshoot of the Macedonian Secret Revolutionary Committee, founded by Georgi Kapchev in Geneva, which send a call to convene an International Congress, which to solve the Macedonian Question in January 1899. This idea is disputed by Bulgarian historians on the grounds that Kapchev was Bulgarian journalist and lawyer.

2004 referendum
In 2004, Todor Petrov and World Macedonian Congress initiated 2004 referendum against changes of administrative divisions. According to the government proposal of municipal border, which would decrease the percentage of Macedonians, and transform Struga and Kicevo into Albanians dominated cities, as well as make Albanian to be official language in capital Skopje. Prior to the vote, a Macedonian newspaper carried a story suggesting that if the referendum succeeded, Albanian militants had planned to blow up a pipeline carrying water to the capital Skopje. Just a day before the referendum, the U.S. recognized the Republic of Macedonia under its constitutional name, therefore trying to change the public opinion and putting pressure. Although 95% voted in favor of the change, the voter turnout of 27% was well below the 50% threshold, and the referendum was unsuccessful.

See also

Macedonian nationalism
Todor Petrov
Macedonian diaspora
Macedonian autonomy referendum, 2004
Makedonsko Sonce
United Macedonia
Macedonia naming dispute

References

Ethnic organizations based in North Macedonia
Macedonian nationalism
1990 establishments in the Socialist Republic of Macedonia
Organizations established in 1990